Sang-woo is a Korean masculine given name. Its meaning differs based on the hanja used to write each syllable of the name.

Hanja
There are 35 hanja with the reading "sang" and 41 hanja with the reading "woo" on the South Korean government's official list of hanja which may be registered for use in given names. Ways of writing this name in hanja include:







People
People with this name include:

Entertainment industry
 Lee Sang-woo (director) (born 1971), South Korean film director
 Kwon Sang-woo (born 1976), South Korean actor 
 Lee Sang-woo (born 1980), South Korean actor
 Do Sang-woo (born 1987), South Korean actor
 Roy Kim (born Kim Sang-woo, 1993), South Korean singer-songwriter
 Chae Sang-woo (born 1999), South Korean actor

Sportspeople
 Lee Sang-u (born 1943, South Korean rower
 Kim Sang-woo (volleyball) (born 1973), South Korean volleyball player
 Kim Sang-woo (referee) (born 1975), South Korean football referee
 Sin Sang-woo (footballer) (born 1976), South Korean football defender (K-League Challenge)
 Kim Sang-woo (footballer, born 1987), South Korean midfielder
 Shin Sang-woo (born 1987), South Korean professional ice hockey winger
 Kang Sang-woo (born 1993), South Korean football midfielder (K-League)
 Cho Sang-woo (born 1994), South Korean baseball pitcher (Korea Baseball Organization)

Other
 Park Sangwoo (born 1958), South Korean writer

Fictional characters
Fictional characters with this name include:
 Yoon Sang-woo, from the 2009−2010 television series Wife Returns
 Lee Sang-woo, from the 2012 television series Seoyoung, My Daughter
 Oh Sang-woo, from the 2016−2019 comics series Killing Stalking
 Cho Sang-woo, from the 2021 Netflix series Squid Game

See also
List of Korean given names

References

Korean masculine given names